The Passionate Pilgrim is a 1921 American drama silent film directed by Robert G. Vignola and written by Samuel Merwin and George DuBois Proctor. The film stars Matt Moore, Mary Newcomb, Julia Swayne Gordon, Tom Guise, Frankie Mann, Rubye De Remer and Claire Whitney. The film was released on January 2, 1921, by Paramount Pictures.

Cast 
Matt Moore as Henry Calverly
Mary Newcomb as Cecily
Julia Swayne Gordon as Madame Watt
Tom Guise as Senator Watt
Frankie Mann as Marjorie Daw
Rubye De Remer as Miriam Calverly
Claire Whitney as Esther
Van Dyke Brooke as Hitt
Charles K. Gerrard as Qualters 
Sam J. Ryan as Major McIntyre
Arthur Donaldson as O'Rell
Albert Roccardi as	Amme
Bernard A. Reinold as Listerly
Charles Brook as Trent
Helen Lindroth as Nurse Russell

Preservation status
An incomplete print survives in the Library of Congress collection.

References

External links 
 
 

1921 films
1920s English-language films
Silent American drama films
1921 drama films
Paramount Pictures films
Films directed by Robert G. Vignola
American black-and-white films
American silent feature films
1920s American films